Emma Leclercq (15 August 1851 – 24 April 1933) was a Belgian cell biologist and feminist lecturer. She was known for being the first female student and graduate from Université libre de Bruxelles, and the first female doctorate earner from Ghent University.

Biography
Leclercq began teaching in Brussels at the Isabelle Gatti de Gamond girls' high school. She petitioned to enroll in the Faculty of Sciences at Université libre de Bruxelles for the 1878-1879 academic year. However, her request was denied until 1880. She earned her bachelor's at U.L.B. in 1883 and her doctorate in natural sciences from Ghent in 1885. In November 1885, she became the only female member of la Société Belge de Microscopie. She studied spermatogenesis at the Collège de France under Édouard-Gérard Balbiani and at Ghent under Charles van Bambeke in 1890. Her papers on spermatogenesis and microorganisms were published in the journal of the French Academy of Sciences the same year. Later, in 1893, she gave lectures on behalf of the Ligue belge du droit des femmes.

References

1851 births
1933 deaths
Scientists from Brussels
Belgian feminists
Free University of Brussels (1834–1969) alumni
19th-century Belgian educators